Percy Hughes (1872–1952) was a philosopher and teacher, and a leading figure in the Philosophy, Education, and Psychology department at Lehigh University.

Life
Hughes was born in Peshawar in British India. A child of missionary Anglican parents, Hughes lived in London before arriving to the United States at the age of 16. He received his A.B degree from Alfred University, and his MA and Ph.D. degrees from the Teachers College at Columbia University under John Dewey, who would become a lifelong friend.

Hughes joined Lehigh University in 1907 as an assistant professor of philosophy, education and psychology, and remained there until his retirement in 1942. A prolific writer, he published extensively in a variety of topics, including philosophy, education and psychology.

Publications
 Hughes, Percy (1928). An Introduction to Psychology: From the standpoint of life-career. Bethlehem, Pa.: Lehigh University Supply Bureau.

References

External links

 Finding Aid to the Percy Hughes Publications and Papers (1872-1952), Special Collections, Linderman Library, Lehigh University
 Percy Hughes Award from the College of Education at Lehigh University

20th-century American philosophers
Lehigh University faculty
Educational psychologists
Philosophers of education
1872 births
1952 deaths